Ohop Lake is a long and narrow shaped lake near Eatonville, Washington, in Pierce County. It covers 218.2 acres and is situated in the Ohop Valley. It can be accessed through the state public boat launch located on the southern end.

The lake is generally warm and slightly murky, making it popular for water sports. Ohop Lake is also popular for fishing.

References

Lakes of Pierce County, Washington
Lakes of Washington (state)